Chantal Simonot was a Front National Member of the European Parliament for the north-west of France. Simonot resigned on 1 October 2004 and was replaced by Fernand Le Rachinel on 22 October.

References

Year of birth missing (living people)
Living people
MEPs for North-West France 2004–2009
21st-century women MEPs for France
National Rally (France) MEPs